Huddersfield Town's 1921-22 campaign saw the club win their first trophy in their 14-year history. By beating Preston North End at Stamford Bridge, Town won the FA Cup for the first and, only time. After an up-and-down season in the league, they finished in 14th place.

Squad at the start of the season

Review
Following a disappointing showing in their first season in the top flight, Town were hoping for better fortunes in their second season. They beat Burnley on 3 December 1921 to rise to second place in the table. However, they won only three of their following 22 games, falling to 19th after a loss at Everton on 18 April 1922. Huddersfield then won their last three matches to finish on the same number of points—39—as the previous season, but three places higher in the table on 14th.

The season is fondly remembered by fans for the club's success in the FA Cup. After needing replays to beat Burnley, Brighton and Blackburn, they beat Millwall 3–0 in the fourth round, and Notts County 3–1 at Turf Moor in the semifinals, to reach their second final in three years. They played Preston North End in the final, just two days after beating them 6–0 in the league. Billy Smith (who along with Ernie Islip had scored a hat-trick in the 6–0 win) scored the only goal from a penalty, and Town won the cup for their first and only time.

Two week later, Huddersfield won the FA Charity Shield by defeating newly crowned league champions Liverpool 1–0 at Old Trafford with Tom Wilson scoring the winning goal.

Squad at the end of the season

Results

Division One

Final League table

FA Cup

1922 FA Charity Shield

Appearances and goals

1921-22
English football clubs 1921–22 season